Club Atlético Independiente (sometimes referred as Independiente de Cañete) is a Peruvian football club, playing in the city of Cañete, Lima, Peru.

History
The Club Atlético Independiente was founded on August 30, 1938.

In 2004 Copa Perú, the club classified to the National Stage, but was eliminated by Olímpico Somos Perú in the Round of 16.

In 2006 Copa Perú, the club classified to the Departamental Stage, but was eliminated by Jesús del Valle in the Semifinals.

In 2018 Copa Perú, the club classified to the Departamental Stage, but was eliminated by Defensor Laure Sur in the Quarterfinals.

Rivalries
Independiente has had a long-standing rivalry with local club Walter Ormeño.

Honours

Regional
Región V:
Winners (1): 2004

Liga Departamental de Lima:
Winners (7): 1971, 1974, 1978, 1979, 1980, 1981, 1994
Runner-up (4): 1972, 1975, 2000, 2004

Liga Provincial de Cañete:
Winners (11): 1974, 1975, 1979, 1994, 1996, 2000, 2003, 2006, 2007, 2009, 2016
Runner-up (4): 2004, 2013, 2017, 2018

Liga Distrital de San Vicente:
Winners (5): 1971, 1972, 2000, 2012, 2017
Runner-up (7): 2007, 2009, 2011, 2013, 2014, 2016, 2018

See also
List of football clubs in Peru
Peruvian football league system

References

External links
 Sin paradero: Por el resurgimiento cañetano

Football clubs in Peru
Association football clubs established in 1938